Indy 500 is a nickname for the Indianapolis 500, a famous automobile race first held in 1911.

Indy 500 may also refer to:

Indy 500, a 1968 racing electro-mechanical game by Kasco
Indy 500 (1977 video game), Atari 2600 console game
Indianapolis 500: The Simulation, or Indy 500 (informal name), a 1989 Amiga computer game
Indy 500 (1995 video game), a Sega arcade video game
"Indy 500" is a model of snowmobiles made by Polaris Industries
"Indie 500," a song by The Wrens from their 1996 album  Secaucus

See also
 Brickyard 400
 Indy GP